Dorothy Featherstone Porter (26 March 1954 – 10 December 2008) was an Australian poet. She was a recipient of the Christopher Brennan Award for lifetime achievement in poetry.

Early life
Porter was born in Sydney. Her father was barrister Chester Porter and her mother, Jean, was a high school chemistry teacher. Porter attended the Queenwood School for Girls. She graduated from the University of Sydney in 1975 with a Bachelor of Arts majoring in English and History.

Works and awards
Porter's awards include The Age Book of the Year for poetry, the National Book Council Award for The Monkey's Mask and the FAW Christopher Brennan Award for poetry. Two of her verse novels were shortlisted for the Miles Franklin Award: What a Piece of Work in 2000 and Wild Surmise in 2003. In 2000, the film The Monkey's Mask was made from her verse novel of the same name. In 2005, her libretto The Eternity Man, co-written with composer Jonathan Mills, was performed at the Sydney Festival.

Porter's last book published during her life was  El Dorado, her fifth verse novel, about a serial child killer. The book was nominated for several awards including the inaugural Prime Minister's Literary Award in 2007 and for Best Fiction in the Ned Kelly Awards.

Two other works have been published posthumously: her poetry collection The Bee Hut (2009), as well as has her final completed work, an essay on literary criticism and emotions, entitled On Passion.

Porter, who found many outlets for writing, including fiction for young adults and libretti for chamber operas, was working on a rock opera called January with Tim Finn at the time of her death.

Personal life

Porter was an open lesbian and in 1993 moved to Melbourne to be with her partner, fellow writer Andrea Goldsmith. The couple were coincidentally both shortlisted in the 2003 Miles Franklin Award for literature. In 2009, Porter was posthumously recognised by the website Samesame.com.au as one of the most influential gay and lesbian Australians.

Porter was a self-described pagan, committed to pagan principles of courage, stoicism and commitment to the earth and beauty.

Death
Porter had been suffering from breast cancer for four years before her death, but "many thought she was winning the battle," according to journalist Matt Buchanan. In the last three weeks of her life she became very sick and was admitted to hospital, where she was in intensive care for the final 10 days. She died aged 54 on 10 December 2008.

On 21 February 2010, actress Cate Blanchett read excerpts from Porter's posthumously published short work on literary criticism and emotions in literature, On Passion, at the Malthouse Theatre, Melbourne.

Brett Dean dedicated the first movement of his "Epitaph for string quintet (viola quintet) (2010)" in memory of Dorothy Porter.

Bibliography
Poetry collections
Little Hoodlum (1975)
Bison (1979)
The Night Parrot (1984)
Driving too Fast (1989)
Crete (1996)
Other Worlds: Poems 1997–2001 (2001)
Poems January–August 2004 (2004)
The Bee Hut (2009, Posthumous)
Love Poems (2010, Posthumous)

Libretti (with composer Jonathan Mills)
The Ghost Wife (2000)
The Eternity Man (2005)

Verse novels
Akhenaten (1992)
The Monkey's Mask (1994)
What a Piece of Work (1999)
Wild Surmise (2002)
El Dorado (2007)

Fiction for young adults
Rookwood (1991)
The Witch Number (1993)

Lyrics
Before Time Could Change Us (2005), music by Paul Grabowsky, performed by the Paul Grabowsky/Katie Noonan Quintet

Literary criticism
On Passion (2010, posthumous)

References

 Dorothy Porter, by Gig Ryan, The Age, 20 December 2008

External links

Australian Literature Resources website, contains information on many Australian writers, including Porter
Dorothy Porter at the Poetry International website
Australian poet Dorothy Porter dies aged 54
Dorothy Porter wikispaces includes many references and collection of resources 
Vale Dorothy Porter, article and interview in Cordite Poetry Review, by poet Peter Minter

1954 births
2008 deaths
Australian opera librettists
Deaths from breast cancer
Australian lesbian writers
Australian LGBT poets
University of Sydney alumni
Deaths from cancer in Victoria (Australia)
Australian musical theatre librettists
Australian LGBT novelists
Australian women novelists
Australian women poets
Australian women dramatists and playwrights
Women opera librettists
20th-century Australian poets
20th-century Australian novelists
20th-century Australian dramatists and playwrights
20th-century Australian women writers
Australian writers of young adult literature
Women writers of young adult literature
20th-century LGBT people
21st-century LGBT people
Australian LGBT dramatists and playwrights